Hapoel Haifa Football Club is an Israeli football club located in Haifa. During the 2022–23 campaign the club have competed in the Israeli Premier League, State Cup and Toto Cup.

Club

Kits

 Provider: Diadora, Le Coq
 Main Sponsor: Leos Media
 Secondary Sponsor:  Almog, Shorashim

First team

Transfers

Summer

In:

Out:

Winter

In:

Out:

Pre-season and friendlies

Competitions

Overview

Ligat Ha'Al

Regular season

Results summary

Results by matchday

Matches

Results overview

Play-off

Relegation round table

Results overview

State Cup

Round of 32

Round of 16

Toto Cup

Group stage

13–14th classification match

Statistics

Appearances and goals

|-
|colspan="12"|Players away from Hapoel Haifa on loan:
|-

|-

|-
|colspan="12"|Players who appeared for Hapoel Haifa that left during the season:
|-

|-

|-

|-

|-

|-

|-
|colspan="12"|Tested players:
|-

|-
|}

Goalscorers

Last updated: 12 May 2019

Assists

Last updated: 12 May 2019

Clean sheets

Updated on 12 May 2019

Disciplinary record

Updated on 12 May 2019

Suspensions

Updated on 12 May 2019

Penalties

Updated on 12 May 2019

Overall

{|class="wikitable" style="text-align: center;"
|-
!
!Total
!Home
!Away
!Natural
|-
|align=left| Games played          || 33 || 15 || 18 || 0
|-
|align=left| Games won             || 6 || 4 || 2 || 
|- 
|align=left| Games drawn           || 14 || 5 || 9 || 
|-
|align=left| Games lost             || 13 || 6 || 7 || 
|-
|align=left| Biggest win             || 3–0  Hapoel Hadera || 3–0  Hapoel Hadera || 2–0  Sektzia Ness Ziona || 
|-
|align=left| Biggest loss       || 1–5  Maccabi Haifa || 1–3  Hapoel Hadera || 1–5  Maccabi Haifa || 
|-
|align=left| Biggest win (League)    || 3–0  Hapoel Hadera || 3–0  Hapoel Hadera || 2–0  Sektzia Ness Ziona || 
|-
|align=left| Biggest loss (League)   || 0–4  F.C. Ashdod || 1–2  Bnei Sakhnin || 0–4  F.C. Ashdod || 
|-
|align=left| Biggest win (Cup)    ||  ||  ||  || 
|-
|align=left| Biggest loss (Cup)     || 1–5  Maccabi Haifa ||  || 1–5  Maccabi Haifa || 
|-
|align=left| Biggest win (Toto)    ||  ||  ||  || 
|-
|align=left| Biggest loss (Toto)   || 1–3  Maccabi Bnei Reineh1–3  Hapoel Hadera || 1–3  Hapoel Hadera || 1–3  Maccabi Bnei Reineh || 
|-
|align=left| Goals scored           || 36 || 11 || 25 || 
|-
|align=left| Goals conceded         || 50 || 12 || 38 || 
|-
|align=left| Goal difference        || -14 || -1 || -13 || 
|-
|align=left| Clean sheets            || 10 || 7 || 3 || 
|-
|--
|-
|align=left| Yellow cards          || 90 || 42 || 48 || 
|-
|align=left| Red cards               || 8 || 3 || 5 || 
|-
|align=left| Most appearances      ||colspan=4|  Ohad Levita (33)
|-
|align=left| Most goals        ||colspan=4|  Liran Serdal (7)
|-
|align=left| Most Assist        ||colspan=4|  Hanan Maman (4)
|-
|align=left| Penalties for   || 7 || 1 || 6 || 
|-
|align=left| Penalties against   || 6 || 2 || 4 || 
|-
|align=left| Winning rate         || % || % || % || 
|-

References

Hapoel Haifa F.C. seasons
Hapoel Haifa